Francisc Fabian (born 21 October 1917) was a Romanian football striker. After he retired from playing football he worked at Steaua Bucureşti's youth center where he taught and formed generations of players, which include Marcel Răducanu, Dan Petrescu and Ion Ion. Later he settled in Turda, where he worked at Sticla Arieșul Turda's youth center where he taught and formed Anton Doboș.

International career
Francisc Fabian played one friendly game at international level for Romania, which ended with a 7–2 loss against Hungary with Fabian scoring Romania's first goal.

Honours
Danubiana Roman
Divizia C: 1946–47

Notes

References

1917 births
Romanian footballers
Romania international footballers
Association football forwards
Liga I players
Liga II players
Liga III players
FC Carmen București players
Olympia București players
CSM Jiul Petroșani players
FC Ripensia Timișoara players
FC CFR Timișoara players
Victoria București players
Faur București players
Year of death missing